Shepherdess Bringing in the Sheep is a painting by Camille Pissarro from 1886.

Ownership dispute
Looted by the Nazis from Raoul Meyer during the German occupation of France, the Pissarro painting was the object of a restitution claim by Raoul Meyer after the war against the art dealer Christoph Bernoulli and again decades later by his daughter, Léone-Noëlle Meyer, against the Fred Jones Jr. Museum at the University of Oklahoma. The museum fought the claim. A settlement was reached in 2016 which involved the circulation of the Pissarro between the Fred Jones Jr. Museum of Art and the Musée d'Orsay. The settlement was later called into question and the case landed back in court.

See also
List of paintings by Camille Pissarro

Sources

 Joachim Pissarro et Claire Durand-Ruel Snollaerts, Pissarro - Catalogue critique des peintures.Volume III.

External links

 Notice du musée d'Orsay.

Paintings by Camille Pissarro
Works subject to a lawsuit
1886 paintings
Sheep in art
Nazi-looted art